Nill De Pauw (born 6 January 1990) is a Congolese professional footballer who plays as a winger. A former youth international for Belgium, De Pauw represents the DR Congo national team.

International career
De Pauw was born in the Democratic Republic of the Congo to a Belgian father and Congolese mother, and moved to Belgium at a young age. He was a youth international for Belgium. On 9 October 2020, De Pauw represented the DR Congo national team in a friendly 3–0 loss to Burkina Faso.

Honours
Lokeren
Belgian Cup: 2011–12, 2013–14

References

External links

1990 births
Living people
Footballers from Kinshasa
Democratic Republic of the Congo footballers
Democratic Republic of the Congo international footballers
Belgian footballers
Belgium youth international footballers
Belgium under-21 international footballers
Belgian sportspeople of Democratic Republic of the Congo descent
Democratic Republic of the Congo people of Belgian descent
Association football forwards
Belgian Pro League players
Ligue 1 players
K.S.C. Lokeren Oost-Vlaanderen players
En Avant Guingamp players
S.V. Zulte Waregem players
Belgian expatriate footballers
Expatriate footballers in France
Democratic Republic of the Congo emigrants to Belgium